Air Transat Flight 961 was an Air Transat flight from Varadero, Cuba to Quebec City, Canada on March 6, 2005.  The aircraft experienced a structural failure in which the rudder detached in flight.  The flight crew were able to regain enough control of the aircraft to return safely to Varadero. , the Airbus A310-308 is no longer in service.

The investigation that followed determined that the manufacturer's inspection procedure for the composite rudder was not adequate. Inspection procedures for composite structures on airliners were changed because of this accident.

Event 

Flight 961 was a routine scheduled commercial flight carrying 262 passengers and 9 crew from Varadero, Cuba to Quebec City on March 6, 2005. At 2:48 am EST, flight 961 took off from Cuba. Then, suddenly, at 3:02 am, the aircraft began a dutch roll after a bang shuddered the aircraft violently. The plane climbed until the crew overcame the aircraft upset by descending. The crew attempted to divert to Fort Lauderdale-Hollywood International Airport but Air Transat operations told the crew that returning to Varadero would be the more prudent option. There were no warnings on the flightdeck indicating a rudder problem or a yaw damper problem. The plane landed safely at 4:19 am. Upon parking at the gate, the crew did another walk around inspection to narrow down the cause of the accident. The inspection revealed that the entire rudder had broken away from the vertical stabilizer of the aircraft.

Cause 
Although most of the cockpit voice recorder and flight data recorder were erased due to the long span of time in which the accident occurred, there were several findings as to the cause of the accident. The aircraft probably had a stress fracture in the tail that went unnoticed for several flights prior to the accident flight and the A310 does not have a mechanism in the tail that suspends the growth of the fracture(s).

The Transportation Safety Board found that inspection program of composite rudders was inadequate. In particular, the durability of the rudder was questioned. Air Transat Flight 961 provided new insights into rudder problems on Airbus A300-600, Airbus A300-600R, and Airbus A310 aircraft.

Aftermath 
The aircraft was repaired and operated until its ultimate retirement. The accident aircraft, fin number 303, is currently retired by Air Transat. The dated aircraft was replaced by the airline with the more modern and efficient Airbus A321neo. All Airbus A310 aircraft were retired from Air Transat as of March 31, 2020.

See also 

 American Airlines Flight 587

References

External links 
 
 

Flight 961
Accidents and incidents involving the Airbus A310
Aviation accidents and incidents in 2005
Aviation accidents and incidents in Cuba
Airliner accidents and incidents caused by in-flight structural failure
2005 in Cuba
March 2005 events in North America